Paul Krempel (February 17, 1900 – June 30, 1973) was an American gymnast. He competed at the 1920 Summer Olympics and the 1928 Summer Olympics.

References

External links
 

1900 births
1973 deaths
American male artistic gymnasts
Olympic gymnasts of the United States
Gymnasts at the 1920 Summer Olympics
Gymnasts at the 1928 Summer Olympics
Gymnasts from Los Angeles
20th-century American people